is a passenger railway station located in the city of Matsuyama, Ehime Prefecture, Japan. It is operated by JR Shikoku and has the station number "U01". The station is also called  named after , the name of haiku poet, Masaoka Shiki, who spent his childhood in Matsuyama.

Lines

Layout
The station, which is unstaffed, consists of two opposed side platforms serving two tracks on an embankment. Line 1 on the east side is the through track while line 2 is the passing loop. There is no station building but both platforms have weather shelters and also "tickets corners" which are small shelters housing automatic ticket vending machines. each platform has its own flight of steps and ramp leading down to the access road. An underpass under the embankment is used to cross from one platform to the other. Designated parking lots for bicycles are provided on the west (Botchan Stadium) side of the station. A siding branches off track 2.

Platforms

History
Japanese National Railways (JNR) opened Ichitsubo Station on 1 October 1964 on the existing Yosan Line. With the privatization of JNR on 1 April 1987, control of the station passed to JR Shikoku.

Surrounding area
Matsuyama Central Park
Baseball stadium (Botchan Stadium)
Sub-stadium (Madonna Stadium)
Sports field
Sports arena
Tennis court
Pool (Aqua Pallet Matsuyama)
Matsuyama Keirin Track
Ehimeken Budokan
Ehime Prefectural Matsuyama Central Senior High School
Iyozu Hikonomito Shrine (Tsubaki Shrine)

See also
 List of Railway Stations in Japan

References

External links
https://www.jr-shikoku.co.jp/01_trainbus/jikoku/pdf/ichitsubo.pdf Station timetable]

Railway stations in Ehime Prefecture
Railway stations in Japan opened in 1964
Railway stations in Matsuyama, Ehime